Fabrizio Guidi (born 13 April 1972 in Pontedera, Province of Pisa) is an Italian former road bicycle racer. Guidi won over 40 races since he turned professional in 1995, including two stages in Giro d'Italia and three stages of 1998 Vuelta a España. He also won the Intergiro competition of Giro d'Italia in 1996, 1999 and 2000. He retired at the end of 2007 season, riding for the British team Barloworld.

Major results

1995
1 stage, Volta a Portugal
1996
1996 Giro d'Italia:
 points classification
1st overall, Danmark Rundt
 Gran Premio della Costa Etruschi
 Grand Prix of Aargau Canton
 Tre Valli Varesine
1997
2 stages, Volta a Portugal
1 stage, Euskal Bizikleta
1998
3 stages, Vuelta a España
 Points Classification.
1999
1 stage, Giro d'Italia
2000
1 stage, Giro d'Italia
1 stage, Tour of Netherlands
2001
1 stage, Tour de Romandie
1 stage, Paris–Nice
2002 Team Coast
1 stage, Brixia Tour
2003 Team Bianchi

2004 – Team CSC
1 stage, Tour de la Région Wallonne
1 stage, Danmark Rundt
2005 – Phonak Hearing Systems
1 stage, Internationale Österreich-Rundfahrt
2006 – Phonak Hearing Systems
1st overall and 2 stages, Tour de la Région Wallonne
1 stage, Internationale Österreich-Rundfahrt
1 stage, Tour de Pologne

See also
 List of doping cases in cycling

References

External links

 

1972 births
Living people
People from Pontedera
Italian male cyclists
Doping cases in cycling
Italian Giro d'Italia stage winners
Italian Vuelta a España stage winners
Danmark Rundt winners
Sportspeople from the Province of Pisa
Cyclists from Tuscany